Gyeru (계루, 桂婁) was an ancient Korean city-state that formed within the former realm of Gojoseon. Ruled by the Gyeru clan, it later became a member of the confederation of Jolbon together with Sono, Jeolno, Sun-no, and Gwan-no, and was given to King Dongmyeong. A number of the members of the Go clan in the Gyeru lineage became kings of Goguyreo, including King Yuri and King Taejo, the second and sixth kings, respectively.

See also
Buyeo kingdom
Jumong
Goguryeo

Goguryeo
History of Korea
Former countries in Korean history
Former countries in East Asia

References